The Photograph may refer to:
 The Photograph (2007 film), an Indonesian film
 The Photograph (2020 film), an American romantic drama film
 The Photograph (novel), a 2003 novel by Penelope Lively

See also 
 Photograph (disambiguation)